Aleksandar Bashliev (born 16 November 1989) is a Bulgarian professional footballer who plays as a defender.

Career
Bashliev signed his first professional contract with Septemvri Simitli. He was capped 28 times for the team, scoring 1 goal. Later, during the 2010–11 season, he played for Pirin Blagoevgrad. There, Bashliev scored his first A PFG goal on 16 April 2011 in a 1–0 home win against Kaliakra Kavarna.

Levski Sofia
During the summer of 2011, Bashliev was bought by Levski Sofia. On 2 July 2011, he made his unofficial debut for Levski in the 1:0 win against Loko Sofia in an exhibition match. His official debut occurred on 8 August 2011, in the 1:0 win against Slavia Sofia, during which he came on as a substitute.

Chernomorets Burgas
On 9 January 2013, Bashliev was transferred to Chernomorets Burgas as a part of the deal for Plamen Dimov to Levski Sofia. He was released at the end of season.

International career
He received his first call-up to the senior national team of his country for a June 2017 World Cup qualifier against Belarus, but did not debut.

Career statistics

External links 
 Profile at Levskisofia.info

References

1989 births
Living people
Bulgarian footballers
First Professional Football League (Bulgaria) players
OFC Pirin Blagoevgrad players
PFC Pirin Blagoevgrad players
PFC Levski Sofia players
PFC Chernomorets Burgas players
FC Septemvri Sofia players
FC Montana players
Association football defenders
Sportspeople from Blagoevgrad